The Choice of a People is a Canadian documentary film, directed by Hugues Mignault and released in 1985. The film recounts the events of the 1980 Quebec referendum, on both the Yes and No sides.

The film premiered on August 30, 1985, at the Montreal World Film Festival.

The film was a shortlisted Genie Award finalist for Best Documentary Film at the 7th Genie Awards in 1986.

References

External links
 

1985 films
1985 documentary films
Canadian documentary films
Documentary films about Quebec politics
Quebec films
French-language Canadian films
1980s Canadian films